Flem Bowen Walker Jr. is a retired United States Army lieutenant general who last served as the Deputy Commanding General and Chief of Staff of the United States Army Materiel Command from 2020 to 2022. Previously, he served as the Deputy Chief of Staff for Logistics and Operations of the United States Army Materiel Command.

His retirement ceremony was held on September 1, 2022.

Awards and decorations

References

Living people
Place of birth missing (living people)
Recipients of the Defense Superior Service Medal
Recipients of the Distinguished Service Medal (US Army)
Recipients of the Legion of Merit
United States Army generals
United States Army personnel of the Gulf War
United States Army personnel of the Iraq War
United States Army personnel of the War in Afghanistan (2001–2021)
Year of birth missing (living people)